Gerdin may refer to:
Viviann Gerdin (born 1944), Swedish politician
Gerdin, Iran (disambiguation)